"Love in the Shadows" is a song recorded by American singer E. G. Daily. It was written by Daily and Harold Faltermeyer, and produced by Faltermeyer. "Love in the Shadows" was first recorded in 1984 for the soundtrack to the movie Thief of Hearts. In 1985, it was re-recorded for Daily's Wild Child debut album, and released as a single in 1986. The song was covered in 1987 by Canadian singer Celine Dion in French, titled "Délivre-moi".

Track listings and formats
7" single (1986)
"Love in the Shadows" – 3:54
"Little Toy" – 3:50

12" single (1986)
"Love in the Shadows" (Special remixed version) – 8:45
"Love in the Shadows" (Dub version) – 4:45
"Little Toy" – 3:50

CD single (2001)
"Love in the Shadows" (Solar City Big Room mix) – 10:44
"Love in the Shadows" (Solar City Epic club mix) – 10:31
"Love in the Shadows" (Solar City Epic club mix II) – 10:10
"Love in the Shadows" (Solar City radio mix) – 4:41
"Love in the Shadows" (Solar City Dark dub) – 5:48
"Love in the Shadows" (Solar City Piano mix) – 3:52
"Love in the Shadows" (Brutal Bill Vocal mix) – 10:52
"Love in the Shadows" (Brutal Bill dub) – 7:32

Charts

Celine Dion version

"Délivre-moi" (meaning "Deliver Me") is the fifth single from Celine Dion's album Incognito, released on June 6, 1988, in Quebec, Canada.

The song was very successful and reached number 4 on the Quebec chart. It entered the chart on June 18, 1988, and spend there fifteen weeks.

It could be later found on Dion's Japanese maxi-single "Unison" (1991). A live version was also included on the Unison home video (1991), which was included that same year on the rare Canadian version of her single "Beauty and the Beast" (1991).

An early music video was made for the Incognito TV special aired in September 1987, produced by Canadian Broadcasting Corporation and directed by Jacques Payette. Later, a second commercial music video was made in 1988 when the single came out.

Track listings and formats
Canadian 7" single
"Délivre-moi" (Edit) – 3:25
"Jours de fièvre" – 5:08

Charts

See also
List of post-disco artists and songs

References

External links

1984 songs
1986 singles
1988 singles
A&M Records singles
Celine Dion songs
E. G. Daily songs
French-language songs
Post-disco songs
Song recordings produced by Harold Faltermeyer
Songs written by Harold Faltermeyer